The Blue Notebooks is the second album by British producer and composer Max Richter, released on 26 February 2004 on 130701, an imprint of FatCat Records.

On 11 May 2018, Deutsche Grammophon released a two-disc fifteenth-anniversary edition of The Blue Notebooks which includes re-recordings, alternate arrangements, and remixes by Jlin, and Konx-Om-Pax.

Background
Richter composed The Blue Notebooks in the run-up to the 2003 invasion of Iraq. He has described it as "a protest album about Iraq, a meditation on violence – both the violence that I had personally experienced around me as a child and the violence of war, at the utter futility of so much armed conflict." The album was recorded about a week after mass protests against the war.

The album features readings from Franz Kafka's The Blue Octavo Notebooks and Czesław Miłosz's Hymn of the Pearl and Unattainable Earth. Both readings are by the British actress Tilda Swinton.

Usage in popular media
The tracks "Shadow Journal" and "Organum" were included in the soundtrack of the animated documentary Waltz with Bashir (2008), while the track "Vladimir's Blues" is featured throughout all three seasons of the TV series The Leftovers (2014-2017).

The track "On the Nature of Daylight" has been used extensively throughout cinema and television, including:
 Stranger than Fiction (2006)
 The Trip (2010)
 Shutter Island (2010); both the original and the remix with Dinah Washington's vocals from her 1960 hit "This Bitter Earth"
 Jiro Dreams of Sushi (2011) 
 Disconnect (2012) 
 White Night (2012)
 Luck episode "Episode Four" (2012)
 The Face of an Angel (2014)
 The Connection (2014); the Dinah Washington remix
 Sherpa (2015)
 Me and Kaminski (2015)
 Arrival (2016); usage of the track disqualified the film's original score from the Academy Awards
 Vatanım Sensin (2016)
 The Innocents (2016)
 Castle Rock episode "The Queen" (2018)
 Togo (2019)
 The Light in Your Eyes episode "The Proposal" (2019)
 9-1-1 episode "Malfunction" (2019)
 35th anniversary of EastEnders (2020)
 Amazing Stories (2020)
 The Handmaid's Tale episode "Progress" (2021); Elisabeth Moss, the series lead, was also the protagonist of the short movie made for the track.
 Kleo (2022)
The Last of Us episode "Long Long Time" (2023)

Critical reception

The Blue Notebooks received widespread critical acclaim from contemporary music critics.

In his positive review, Mark Pytlik of Pitchfork explains,The Blue Notebooks is a case study in direct, minor-key melody. Each of the piano pieces [...] establish strong melodic motifs in under two minutes, all the while resisting additional orchestration. Elsewhere, Richter's string suites are similarly striking; "On the Nature of Daylight" coaxes a stunning rise out of gently provincial arrangements while the comparatively epic penultimate track "The Trees" boasts an extended introductory sequence for what is probably the album's closest brush with grandiosity.

Richter's slightly less traditional pieces also resound; both the underwater choral hymnal "Iconography" and the stately organ piece "Organum" echo the spiritual ambience that characterized his work for Future Sound of London. There is absolutely nothing exclusive or contrived-feeling about it. In fact, not only is Richter's second album one of the finest of the last six months, it is also one of the most affecting and universal contemporary classical records in recent memory.In 2019, The Guardian writers ranked The Blue Notebooks the 21st greatest work of art music since 2000, with John Lewis praising "On the Nature of Daylight" as a piece in which "ever-expanding layers of strings are used to heart-tugging effect."

Track listing

Featured readings:
 Track 1 reading from "The First Notebook" in Franz Kafka's The Blue Octavo Notebooks
 Track 4 reading from "At Dawn" in Czesław Miłosz's Unattainable Earth
 Track 7 reading from "The Third Notebook" in Franz Kafka's The Blue Octavo Notebooks
 Track 8 reading from "The Fourth Notebook" in Franz Kafka's The Blue Octavo Notebooks
 Track 10 reading from "The Wormwood Star" movement of "The Separate Notebooks" in Czesław Miłosz's Hymn Of The Pearl

Personnel 
Credits adapted from The Blue Notebooks: 15 Years Edition interior booklet:

 Reader: Tilda Swinton (1, 4, 7, 8, 10)
 Piano: Max Richter (1, 3, 6, 8, 10, 11, 12, 14-16)
 Electronics: Max Richter (1, 3-5, 7-10, 17)
 Violins: Louisa Fuller and Natalia Bonner (2, 4, 7, 10, 15, 18)
 Viola: John Metcalfe (2, 4, 7, 10, 15, 18)
 Cellos: Philip Sheppard and Chris Worsey (2, 4, 7, 10, 18); Chris Worsey and Ian Burdge (15)
 Max Richter Orchestra conducted by Lorenz Dangel (13)
 Vocals: Dinah Washington (18)

Release history

References

External links 
 The Blue Notebooks at Fat Cat
 "Essential Listening: The Blue Notebooks“ at artistxite
 Track by track guide to The Blue Notebooks  at Drowned In Sound

2004 albums
Max Richter albums
FatCat Records albums